The Court of Ecclesiastical Causes Reserved is an appellate court within the hierarchy of ecclesiastical courts of the Church of England. Hearing cases involving church doctrine, ceremony, or ritual, the court has jurisdiction over both the Province of Canterbury and the Province of York.

Activity
The Court of Ecclesiastical Causes Reserved was created in 1963 with appellate jurisdiction in matters of doctrine, ritual or ceremonial.

Complaints against priests or deacons may be vetoed by their bishop and those against a bishop by the appropriate archbishop. Before a case is heard, a preliminary enquiry by a committee decides whether there is a case to answer. In the case of a priest or deacon, the Committee of Inquiry consists of the diocesan bishop, two members of the Lower House of Convocation of the province, and two diocesan chancellors. There are other provisions where the accused is a bishop.

If the committee allows the case to proceed, the Upper House of Convocation appoints a complainant against the accused in the Court for Ecclesiastical Causes Reserved, where the procedure resembles that of an assize court exercising jurisdiction but without a jury. However, the court sits with five advisers chosen from panels of theologians or liturgiologists.

As of 2012, the court has sat in only two cases:
 Re St Michael and All Angels, Great Torrington
 Re St Stephen Walbrook

The first case dealt with the introduction of an icon and candlestick into a church without a faculty (exemption from the usual practice) being granted beforehand. The second case allowed the use of a marble sculpture by Henry Moore as an altar table.

Composition
The court's five judges are appointed by the Sovereign. Two must be judges (or have held high judicial office), and must also be communicant members of the Church of England; the remaining three must be (or have been) diocesan bishops.

In criminal cases there must be not be fewer than three nor more than five advisers, who are selected by the Dean of the Arches and Auditor from a panel of eminent theologians and liturgiologists.

Current members
The following were appointed to the court by royal warrant under the royal sign manual for a five-year term beginning on 1 December 2021:
 Martin Warner (Bishop of Chichester)
 Rachel Treweek (Bishop of Gloucester)
 Guli Francis-Dehqani (Bishop of Chelmsford)
 Keith Lindblom (a Lord Justice of Appeal)
 Stephen Males (a Lord Justice of Appeal)

Former members

References

External links
 Ecclesiastical Jurisdiction Measure 1963

Courts of England and Wales
Canon law of the Church of England
Ecclesiastical courts